Android Apocalypse (also known as Facing Extinction) is a 2006 science fiction film starring Scott Bairstow and Joseph Lawrence. The film was written by Karl Schiffman and directed by Paul Ziller for Sci Fi Channel as a television film. It is set on a post-apocalyptic Earth that is ruled by androids, and explores the relationship between a human, Jute (Bairstow), and an android, DeeCee (Lawrence) who is beginning to develop emotions.

Premise
On an android-controlled, post-apocalyptic Earth a human man named Jute (Scott Bairstow) is convicted of murdering an android. Dee-Cee (Joseph Lawrence) is an android who is beginning to develop human emotion, and is being transported to an android-run prison facility along with Jute. While in transit, their police vehicle is attacked. Jute and Dee-Cee escape and are forced into a strained alliance in order to survive in the harsh deserts of the world. As these two characters flee android authorities they stumble upon a genocidal plot being orchestrated by the leader of the androids, who hopes to rid the planet of human life forever.

Cast
 Scott Bairstow as Jute
 Joseph Lawrence as Dee-Cee
 Chris Jericho as Tee-Dee
 Troy Skog as Varrta
 Wendy Anderson as Mrs. Carlson
 Brian Hlushko as Eric Carlson
 Mike O'Brien as Link Hamilton
 Amy Matysio as Rachael
 Shannon Jardine as Joy
 Corey Livingstone as Borka
 Anne Nahabedian as Tranc
 Aidan Simpson as Polton
 J.J. Elliott as Night Club Goer

Distribution
Android Apocalypse was a television film produced for the Sci-Fi Channel. It was first aired on the 24th of June, 2006.  Previously viewed DVD copies have been available at some Dollar Tree stores.

Reception
Android Apocalypse was not received well by critics or the public. It was given mediocre reviews and remains fairly unpopular.

References

External links
 
 
 

2006 television films
2006 films
2006 science fiction films
American science fiction television films
Canadian science fiction television films
English-language Canadian films
Android (robot) films
Syfy original films
American post-apocalyptic films
Canadian post-apocalyptic films
Films directed by Paul Ziller
2000s American films
2000s Canadian films